This article contains information about the literary events and publications of 1733.

Events
February 20 – The first epistle of Alexander Pope's poem An Essay on Man is published anonymously.
March 29 – The second epistle of Pope's An Essay on Man is published.
May – Voltaire begins his long-term relationship with Emilie de Breteuil, marquise du Chatelet.
May 8 – The third epistle of Pope's An Essay on Man is published.
Autumn – Laurence Sterne enters Jesus College, Cambridge.
October – Charles Macklin makes his debut at Drury Lane Theatre in The Recruiting Officer.

New books

Prose
George Berkeley – The Theory of Vision
James Bramston – The Man of Taste (answer to Pope from 1732)
John Durant Breval (as Joseph Gay) – Morality in Vice (part of Curll's continuing war with John Gay)
Peter Browne – Things Supernatural and Divine Conceived by Analogy with things Natural and Human
George Cheyne – The English Malady
Thomas-Simon Gueullette – Les Mille et une Heures, contes péruviens (Peruvian Tales: Related in One Thousand and One Hours, by One of the Select Virgins of Cusco)
John Hervey, 2nd Baron Hervey – An Epistle from a Nobleman to a Doctor of Divinity
George Lyttelton, 1st Baron Lyttelton – Advice to a Lady
Samuel Madden – Memoirs of the Twentieth Century (roman à clef about George II)
David Mallet – Of Verbal Criticism (to Pope)
Thomas Newcomb – The Woman of Taste (reaction to Pope's Epistle of 1732)
Alexander Pope
"Of the Nature and State of Man, with Respect to" (3) "Society" (continuation of Essay on Man; the first two "epistles" published in 1732, the fourth in 1744)
Of the Use of Riches: An Epistle to Lord Bathurst (also as Epistle to Bathurst)
The Impertinent
Elizabeth Singer Rowe – Letters Moral and Entertaining
Jonathan Swift
On Poetry, a Rhapsody (contains explicit attacks on George II and many of the "dunces", resulting in arrests and prosecution.)
The Life and Genuine Character of Doctor Swift
Voltaire – Letters Concerning the English Nation
Isaac Watts – Philosophical Essays

Drama
 William Bond – The Tuscan Treaty
John Durant Breval – The Rape of Helen (printed 1737)
Charles Coffey – The Boarding School (performed and published)
Henry Fielding – The Miser (from Molière)
John Gay (died 1732) – Achilles (opera)
Eliza Haywood – The Opera of Operas (adaptation of Fielding's Tom Thumb, with a pro-Walpole "reconciliation" scene) (opera)
William Havard – Scanderbeg
John Kelly – Timon in Love
Edward Phillips
The Livery Rake
The Mock Lawyer
The Stage Mutineers
António José da Silva – Vida do Grande Dom Quixote de la Mancha e do Gordo Sancho Pança
Lewis Theobald (ed.) – The Works of Shakespeare
Lewis Theobald – The Fatal Secret

Poetry
Anonymous – Verses Address'd to the Imitator of the First Satire of the Second Book of Horace (attrib. Lady Mary Wortley Montagu, to Pope)
John Banks – Poems on Several Occasions
Samuel Bowden – Poetical Essays
Mary Chandler – A Description of Bath
Thomas Fitzgerald – Poems
Matthew Green (as Peter Drake) – The Grotto
James Hammond – An Elegy to a Young Lady
Alexander Pope –The First Satire of the Second Book of Horace
See also 1733 in poetry

Births
January 12 – Antoine-Marin Lemierre, French poet and dramatist (died 1793)
March 13 – Joseph Priestley, English natural philosopher and theologian (died 1804)
March 18 – Christoph Friedrich Nicolai, German critic and bookseller (died 1811)
August 22 – Jean-François Ducis, French dramatist (died 1816)
September 5 – Christoph Martin Wieland, German poet (died 1813)
Unknown date – Robert Lloyd, English poet and satirist (died 1764)

Deaths
January 21 – Bernard de Mandeville, Dutch-born satirist and philosopher writing in English (born 1670)
March 12 – Michel Le Quien, French theologian and historian (born 1661)
March 13 – Mademoiselle Aïssé, Circassian-born French letter-writer (born c. 1694)
May 10 – Jacob August Franckenstein, German lexicographer (born 1689)
June 23 – Johann Jakob Scheuchzer, Swiss scholar (born 1672)
August 16 – Matthew Tindal, English deist writer (born 1657)
Unknown date – John Dunton, English writer and bookseller (born 1659)

References

 
Years of the 18th century in literature